The 1984 Kentucky Wildcats football team represented the University of Kentucky in the 1984 NCAA Division I-A football season. The Wildcats scored 293 points while allowing 221 points.  Kentucky won the 1984 Hall of Fame Classic Bowl.

Season
Kentucky opened with a 42–0 win over Kent State, followed by a 48–14 win at Indiana.  A 30–26 win at Tulane was followed by a 27–14 win over Rutgers, which put Kentucky into the AP poll at #19.  The Wildcats then won their conference opener at Mississippi State, 17–13, to improve to 5–0 for the first time since 1950.  Kentucky was then ranked #16 in the AP poll.

Kentucky then dropped two conference games against ranked opponents, to #10 LSU 36–10 and to #13 Georgia 37–7.  The Wildcats clinched a winning season with a 31–7 win against North Texas and then defeated Vanderbilt 27–18.  A 25–17 loss to #5 Florida followed.  Kentucky then closed out the regular season with a 17–12 victory at Tennessee.

Kentucky closed its season with a 20–19 victory over #19 Wisconsin in the 1984 Hall of Fame Classic Bowl.  As a result, Kentucky finished the season ranked #19 in the final AP poll, with a record of 9–3.

Schedule

Team players in the 1985 NFL Draft

References

Kentucky
Kentucky Wildcats football seasons
All-American Bowl champion seasons
Kentucky Wildcats football